Rear Admiral George Noel Green was a South African Navy officer who served as Chief of Naval Staff Logistics.

Early life

He was born in Johannesburg, a son of a marine engineer who had a long association with life at sea.

World War 2

He joined the Royal Navy in 1938 as a Boy Seaman 2nd class and later attained the rank of petty officer. He was appointed as an officer in the Royal Navy on 1 January 1945 at the rank of sub lieutenant. Torpedo officer and Watchkeeping Officer on the HMS Caesar. Torpedo Anti Submarine officer and Assistant Navigator on HMS Bellona. Officer of the Quarters and Forecastle officer on HMS Nigeria. He served on the battleship HMS Hood, later destroyed by gunfire from the Bismarck. During the assault on Tobruk, his  Tank Landing Craft was blown from under him.

South African navy career
  
He transferred to the South African Navy on 1 May 1947 with the rank of lieutenant. OC SAS Transvaal in May 1947-August 1957. OC Naval College from 1964-1966. He was promoted to Naval captain on 1 July 1966. Senior Naval Staff Officer Maritime Headquarters at Silvermine in 1966-1969. OC SAS President Steyn, SAS President Kruger beginning in July 1966-1971. He was promoted to Commodore in 1972 and served as the Officer Commanding Simonstown Naval Dockyard. He was promoted to rear admiral and succeeded R Adm Fido Walters as CNS Logistics on 1 October 1977.

Awards and decorations

See also
List of South African admirals

References

South African admirals
1921 births

Possibly living people